Pier Andrea Saccardo (23 April 1845 in Treviso, Treviso – 12 February 1920 in Padua) was an Italian botanist and mycologist.

Life 

Saccardo studied at the Lyceum in Venice, and then at the Technical Institute of the University of Padua where, in 1867 he received his doctorate. He was an Assistant to Roberto de Visiani (1800-1878) an Italian botanist, naturalist and scholar.
Then in 1869, he became a professor of Natural History in Padua. In 1876 he established the mycological journal Michelia which published many of his early mycological papers. In 1879 he became a professor of Botany and director of the botanical gardens of the university until 1915. He accumulated around 70,000 fungal specimens encompassing over 18,500 different species for his herbarium. Which is still stored at the university.

Saccardo's scientific activity focused almost entirely on mycology. He wrote his first book in 1864 (when he was 19 years old), Flora Montellica: an introduction to the flora Trevigiana. In 1872, he published Mycologiae Venetae Specimen, in which he described some 1200 fungi species. He published over 140 papers on the Deuteromycota (imperfect mushrooms) and the Pyrenomycetes. He was most famous for his Sylloge, which was a comprehensive list of all of the names that had been used for mushrooms. Sylloge is still the only work of this kind that was both comprehensive for the botanical kingdom Fungi and reasonably modern. Saccardo also developed a system for classifying the imperfect fungi by spore color and form, which became the primary system used before classification by DNA analysis.

Chromotaxy scale

Saccardo proposed this color scale in 1894, for standardizing color naming of plant specimens.

Selected publications
Indispensable in the history of mycology is his master work Sylloge fungorum omnium hucusque cognitorum (Padua 1882–90, in nine volumes) followed by the 1931 edition in 25 volumes.

Books
 Prospetto della Flora Trivigiana (Venice 1864)
 Bryotheca Tarvisina (Treviso 1864)
 Della storia e letteratura della Flora Veneta (Milan 1869)
 Sommario d'un corso di botanica (3rd ed., Padua 1880)
 Musci Tarvisini (Treviso 1872)
 Mycologiae Venetae specimen (Padua 1873)
 Mycotheca Veneta (Padua 1874–79)
 Michelis, commentarium mycologicum (Padua 1877 to 1882, 2 volumes.)
 Fungi italici autographie delineati et colorati (Padua 1877–86, with 1,500 tables)

Personal life
He had a son, Domenico Saccardo (1872 - 1952) and daughter, Neffe Francesco Saccardo (1869 - 1896).

Taxa named by him and in his honour

Saccardo was one of the most prolific taxonomists in the history of Fungi. He has described some 1200 fungi species, including 52 that were new to science for one book.

He has also described 3 species of plants;
 Antennaria rectangularis 
 Hibiscus pentacarpos var. albiflorus  now a synonym of Kosteletzkya pentacarpos
 Ophrys integra  now a synonym of Ophrys apifera

He was honoured in the naming of various genera and species;
 Saccardoa  1869, (Lichenes), synonym of Pseudocyphellaria 
 Saccardia  (Saccardiaceae family) in Grevillea 7: 49 in 1878.
 Saccardoella {{Au|Speg. 1879, (Sordariomycetes class)]] in Michelia 1(5): 461 in 1879.
 Saccardinula  (Elsinoaceae family) in Anales Soc. Sci. Argent. 19: 257 in 1885.
 Pasaccardoa  1891, (in the Asteraceae family.
 Saccardaea  now a synonym of Venustosynnema ciliatum.
 Saccardophytum , first published in Anales Soc. Ci. Argent. 53: 181 in 1902, now a synonym of Benthamiella.
 Saccardomyces  (Trichosphaeriaceae family) in Hedwigia 43: 353 in 1904.
 Phaeosaccardinula  (Chaetothyriaceae family) in Hedwigia 44: XIV, 67 in 1905.
 Neosaccardia  (fungi), synonym of Scleroderma

References

This article is based, in part, on information from the Meyers Konversations-Lexikon of 1890.

Other sources
 Davis, J. J. (August 1920) "Pier Andrea Saccardo" Botanical Gazette 70(2): pp. 156–157
 Dörfelt, Heinrich and Heklau, Heike (1998) Die Geschichte der Mykologie (The History of Mycology) Einhorn-Verlag E. Dietenberger, Schwäbisch Gmünd,

External links
 "Pier Andrea Saccardo (1845–1921)" Illinois Mycological Association
 Wubah, Daniel A. (1999) "History of Mycology" Towson University, MD
 Saccardo's (1894) Chromotaxia, seu nomenclator colorum... ad usum botanicorum et zoologorum (in English, French, German, Italian, and Latin) – digital facsimile from the Linda Hall Library

Italian mycologists
19th-century Italian botanists
1920 deaths
1845 births
20th-century Italian botanists